The War on Democracy is a 2007 documentary film directed by Christopher Martin and John Pilger, who also wrote the narration. Focusing on the political situations in nations of Latin America, the film criticizes both the United States' intervention in foreign countries' domestic politics and its "War on Terrorism". The film was first released in the United Kingdom on 15 June 2007. Critics accuse the film of fostering anti-American sentiment.

Production 
The film was produced over a two-year period. Carl Deal, chief archivist on the Michael Moore films Fahrenheit 9/11 and Bowling for Columbine, provided the archive footage used in the film. It is mastered in high-definition video.

Distribution 
The War on Democracy was screened at both the 2007 Cannes Film Festival and the Galway Film Festival. The film was sold to distributors Lionsgate for distribution in the U.K. and Hopscotch distribution in Australia and New Zealand. Pre-release screening took place at two Fopp locations on 12 June 2007, including one that was followed by a question and answer session with co-director John Pilger. Some in Chile accused Pilger of Chilenophobia by "attacking all Chileans who 'did not speak up to the dictatorship'" and "accusing Pinochet of fascism."

Reception
Peter Bradshaw wrote in The Guardian:

Andrew Billen wrote in The Times:

James Walton in The Daily Telegraph thought that while "Pilger stressed that Venezuela's potential utopia is under threat", he "made exactly the same claims for Chavez that he was making for the Sandinistas in Nicaragua" in the 1980s. In Pilger's account of US involvement in Latin America, Walton wrote, "while this was the most familiar section of the programme, it was also the most powerful and persuasive – because, once he was attacking his baddies, Pilger duly seemed on more solid ground. His recital, pretty polished by now, included chapter and verse on American involvement in torture, massacres and terrorism. He exposed (again) 'the epic lie' that this was done for the sake of democracy".

The War on Democracy won the One World Media TV Documentary Award in 2008.

Box office
The War on Democracy grossed $199,500 at the box office in Australia.

See also 
The Revolution Will Not Be Televised, documentary filmed from within the Chavez camp during the failed coup of 2002.
South of the Border, documentary by Oliver Stone
Bolivarian revolution
Hugo Chávez
Economy of Venezuela

References

External links
 The War on Democracy, Complete documentary online, at www.johnpilger.com
 "Have Your Say - Live!!!, with John Pilger", BBC News World
 Review, Empire
 Review, NarcoNews
 

2007 films
Anti-Americanism
Anti-Chilean sentiment
Documentary films about American politics
Documentary films about Latin America
Documentary films about Latin American military dictatorships
Documentary films presented by John Pilger
Hispanophobia
War on terror
2000s English-language films
2000s American films